The 2020–21 Air Force Falcons men's ice hockey season was the 53rd season of play for the program and the 15th season in the Atlantic Hockey conference. The Falcons represented the United States Air Force Academy and were coached by Frank Serratore, in his 24th season.

The start of the college hockey season was delayed due to the ongoing coronavirus pandemic. As a result, Air Force's first scheduled game was in late-November as opposed to early-October, which was the norm.

Season
As a result of the ongoing COVID-19 pandemic the entire college ice hockey season was delayed. Because the NCAA had previously announced that all winter sports athletes would retain whatever eligibility they possessed through at least the following year, none of Air Force's players would lose a season of play. However, the NCAA also approved a change in its transfer regulations that would allow players to transfer and play immediately rather than having to sit out a season, as the rules previously required.

Air Force was consistently ranked as one of the worst teams for most of the season. The Falcon's went winless in their first 10 matches and their offense was particularly weak, averaging less than 2 goals per game in those matches. Near the end of the season Air Force's offense finally was able to cobble together a collection of goals that gave the team a three-game winning streak. They entered the Atlantic Hockey Tournament hoping to continue their run, unfortunately, Bentley ended the Falcons' year with a 3–7 loss.

Luke Rowe sat out the season.

Departures

Recruiting

Roster

As of August 31, 2020.

Standings

Schedule and results

|-
!colspan=12 style=";" | Regular Season

|-
!colspan=12 style=";" |

Scoring statistics

Goaltending statistics

Rankings

USCHO did not release a poll in week 20.

Awards and honors

References

Air Force Falcons men's ice hockey seasons
Air Force Falcons
Air Force Falcons
Air Force Falcons
Air Force Falcons
Air Force Falcons